Matteo Simone Trefoloni (born 31 March 1971) is an Italian former Italian football referee, who refereed many UEFA matches over the years.

He sent Rangers goalkeeper Allan McGregor off in a UEFA Cup against Hapoel Tel Aviv played in February 2007. Trefoloni returned to Scotland on 17 September 2008 to take charge of the match between Celtic and Aalborg in the UEFA Champions League.

References 

1971 births
Italian football referees
Living people